James L. Dix House is a historic home located at Glens Falls, Warren County, New York.  It was built in 1866 and is a two-story, hip-roofed, brick vernacular residence with Italianate and Colonial Revival style design elements.  It consists of a three-bay main block with a two-story, gable-roofed service wing.

It was added to the National Register of Historic Places in 1984.

References

Houses on the National Register of Historic Places in New York (state)
Colonial Revival architecture in New York (state)
Italianate architecture in New York (state)
Houses completed in 1866
Houses in Warren County, New York
1866 establishments in New York (state)
National Register of Historic Places in Warren County, New York